Frederick Robert Cromwell (May 13, 1872 – October 16, 1950) was a Canadian politician in the province of Quebec.

Born in Leeds, Megantic County, Quebec, the son of Thomas and Elizabeth (Kinnear) Cromwell, Cromwell was educated at public schools. He was mayor of Clinton, Quebec in 1902, a councilor in Eaton, Quebec in 1907, and a councilor in Cooksville, Quebec from 1909 to 1912. A farmer and manager, he was elected to the House of Commons of Canada for the electoral district of Compton in the 1911 federal election. A Conservative, he did not run in 1917 but was defeated when he ran again in 1921.

References 
 
 

1872 births
1950 deaths
Conservative Party of Canada (1867–1942) MPs
Members of the House of Commons of Canada from Quebec
Anglophone Quebec people